Admiral Sir Peter Geoffrey Marshall Herbert,  (28 February 1929 – 3 May 2019) was a senior Royal Navy officer and former Vice-Chief of the Defence Staff.

Naval career
Educated at Dunchurch Hall and the Britannia Royal Naval College, Herbert was commissioned into the Royal Navy in 1949. He served in submarines for much of his early career and then became Commander of the nuclear-powered submarine, HMS Valiant, in 1963.

He was made Commanding Officer of the cruiser HMS Blake in 1974, and then Deputy Chief of the Polaris Executive in 1976. He went on to be Flag Officer, Carriers and Amphibious Ships in 1978 and Director-General, Naval Manpower and Training in 1980.

He was appointed Flag Officer Submarines and Commander, Submarines, Eastern Atlantic Area in 1981 and in that role took part in the Falklands War. He became Vice-Chief of the Defence Staff in 1983.

In retirement he became a Non-Executive Director of Radamec Group plc.

He died on 3 May 2019 at the age of 90.

Family
In 1953, he married Anne Maureen McKeown (died 11 January 2012) and they went on to have one son and one daughter.

References

|-
 

 

1929 births
2019 deaths
Knights Commander of the Order of the Bath
Officers of the Order of the British Empire
Royal Navy admirals
Royal Navy personnel of the Falklands War